Rafael "Fito" Ramos (born January 1, 1965) is a retired boxer from Puerto Rico. He competed in the 1984 Summer Olympics and twice won a medal (gold and bronze) at the Pan American Games during his career.

1984 Olympic record
Below are the results of Rafael Ramos, a Puerto Rican light flyweight boxer who competed at the 1984 Olympics in Los Angeles:

 Round of 32 defeated Carlos Salazar (Argentina) by walkover
 Round of 16: defeated Jesus Herrera (Dominican Republic) by decision, 4-1
 Quarterfinal: lost to Salvatore Todisco (Italy) by decision, 1-4

References

 

1965 births
Living people
People from Fajardo, Puerto Rico
Flyweight boxers
Olympic boxers of Puerto Rico
Boxers at the 1984 Summer Olympics
Boxers at the 1983 Pan American Games
Boxers at the 1987 Pan American Games
Place of birth missing (living people)
Puerto Rican male boxers
Pan American Games gold medalists for Puerto Rico
Pan American Games bronze medalists for Puerto Rico
Pan American Games medalists in boxing
Medalists at the 1983 Pan American Games
Medalists at the 1987 Pan American Games